The 2022 Eastern Eagles football team represented Eastern University as an independent school during the 2022 NCAA Division III football season. The Eagles, were led by 1st-year head coach Billy Crocker they played their home games in St. Davids, Pennsylvania.

Schedule

Personnel

Coaching staff

Roster

References

Eastern
Eastern Eagles football seasons
Eastern Eagles football